Impromptu is an album by American jazz pianist Billy Taylor which was recorded in 1962 and released on the Mercury label.

Reception

Allmusic awarded the album 4 stars stating "Several of these songs have remained in his repertoire and have been recorded again in the decades that followed".

Track listing
All compositions by Billy Taylor
 "Capricious" - 2:20  
 "Impromptu" - 9:35  
 "Don't Go Down South" - 3:47  
 "Muffle Guffle" - 4:48  
 "Free and Oozy" - 6:27  
 "Paraphrase" - 4:48  
 "Empty Ballroom (Une Salle de Bal Vide)" - 4:20  
 "At la Carousel" - 6:08

Personnel 
Billy Taylor - piano 
Jim Hall - guitar 
Bob Cranshaw - bass
Walter Perkins - drums

References 

1962 albums
Billy Taylor albums
Mercury Records albums